Cnaphalocrocis trebiusalis is a species of moth of the family Crambidae. 
It can be found from Africa to south-east Asia.

References 

Moths described in 1859
Spilomelinae